Agonopterix cachritis is a moth of the family Depressariidae. It is found in Spain and on Sardinia and Cyprus. It has also been reported from North Africa and Syria.

The wingspan is 17–22 mm.

References

Moths described in 1859
Agonopterix
Moths of Europe
Moths of Africa
Moths of Asia